Carlos Alberto López Rivera (born September 14, 1958) is a Puerto Rican politician and current mayor of Dorado. López is affiliated with the Popular Democratic Party (PPD) and has served as mayor since 1987.

Early years and studies

Carlos Alberto López Rivera was born in Dorado on September 14, 1958 to Pedro López Maldonado and Ana Rivera. He graduated from the José S. Alegría High School and then completed a Bachelor's degree in Business Management, with a major in Accounting and Finances, from the University of Puerto Rico.

Political career

López was first sworn in as mayor of Dorado on August 3, 1987 succeeding Alfonso López Chaar. He was then officially elected at the 1988 general elections. He has been reelected in 1992, 1996, 2000, 2004, 2008 and 2012.

In 1997, López was convicted for crimes against public order but never served time. His case can be looked up in the Puerto Rico Judicial Branch website under case number G4CR199700460.

References

External links
Carlos López Rivera Biography

1958 births
Mayors of places in Puerto Rico
Popular Democratic Party (Puerto Rico) politicians
Living people
People from Dorado, Puerto Rico
University of Puerto Rico alumni